Thunderbolt is the brand name of a hardware interface for the connection of external peripherals to a computer. It has been developed by Intel, in collaboration with Apple. It was initially marketed under the name Light Peak, and first sold as part of an end-user product on 24 February 2011.

Thunderbolt combines PCI Express (PCIe) and DisplayPort (DP) into two serial signals, and additionally provides DC power, all in one cable. Up to six peripherals may be supported by one connector through various topologies. Thunderbolt 1 and 2 use the same connector as Mini DisplayPort (MDP), whereas Thunderbolt 3 and 4 reuse the USB-C connector from USB.

Description

Thunderbolt controllers multiplex one or more individual data lanes from connected PCIe and DisplayPort devices for transmission via two duplex Thunderbolt lanes, then de-multiplex them for use by PCIe and DisplayPort devices on the other end. A single Thunderbolt port supports up to six Thunderbolt devices via hubs or daisy chains; as many of these as the host has DP sources may be Thunderbolt monitors.

A single Mini DisplayPort monitor or other device of any kind may be connected directly or at the very end of the chain. Thunderbolt is interoperable with DP-1.1a compatible devices. When connected to a DP-compatible device, the Thunderbolt port can provide a native DisplayPort signal with four lanes of output data at no more than 5.4 Gbit/s per Thunderbolt lane. When connected to a Thunderbolt device, the per-lane data rate becomes 10 Gbit/s and the four Thunderbolt lanes are configured as two duplex lanes, each 10 Gbit/s comprising one lane of input and one lane of output.

Thunderbolt can be implemented on PCIe graphics cards, which have access to DisplayPort data and PCIe connectivity, or on the motherboard of new computers with onboard video, such as the MacBook Air.

The interface was originally intended to run exclusively on an optical physical layer using components and flexible optical fiber cabling developed by Intel partners and at Intel's Silicon Photonics lab. It was initially marketed under the name Light Peak, and after 2011 as Silicon Photonics Link. However, it was discovered that conventional copper wiring could furnish the desired 10 Gbit/s per channel at lower cost.

This copper-based version of the Light Peak concept was co-developed by Apple and Intel. Apple registered Thunderbolt as a trademark, but later transferred the mark to Intel, which held overriding intellectual-property rights.  Thunderbolt was commercially introduced on Apple's 2011 MacBook Pro, using the same Apple-developed connector as Mini DisplayPort.  Certain MacBook Air and Macbook Pro models, and Mac Studio, downgrade Thunderbolt 4 protocol to Thunderbolt 3 due to Intel patents and the need for Intel VT-d DMA.

Sumitomo Electric Industries started selling up to  optical Thunderbolt cables in Japan in January 2013, and Corning, Inc., began selling up to  optical cables in the US in late September 2013.

History

Introduction
Intel introduced Light Peak at the 2009 Intel Developer Forum (IDF), using a prototype Mac Pro logic board to run two 1080p video streams plus LAN and storage devices over a single 30-meter optical cable with modified USB ends. The system was driven by a prototype PCI Express card, with two optical buses powering four ports. Jason Ziller, head of Intel's Optical I/O Program Office showed the internal components of the technology under a microscope and the sending of data through an oscilloscope. The technology was described as having an initial speed of 10 Gbit/s over plastic optical cables, and promising a final speed of 100 Gbit/s. At the show, Intel said Light Peak-equipped systems would begin to appear in 2010, and posted a YouTube video showing Light Peak-connected HD cameras, laptops, docking stations, and HD monitors.

On 4 May 2010, in Brussels, Intel demonstrated a laptop with a Light Peak connector, indicating that the technology had shrunk enough to fit inside such a device, and had the laptop send two simultaneous HD video streams down the connection, indicating that at least some fraction of the software/firmware stacks and protocols were functional. At the same demonstration, Intel officials said they expected hardware manufacturing to begin around the end of 2010.

In September 2010, some early commercial prototypes from manufacturers were demonstrated at Intel Developer Forum 2010.

Copper vs. optical

Though Thunderbolt was originally conceived as an optical technology, Intel switched to electrical connections to reduce costs and to supply up to 10 watts of power to connected devices.

In 2009, Intel officials said the company was "working on bundling the optical fiber with copper wire so Light Peak can be used to power devices plugged into the PC." In 2010, Intel said the original intent was "to have one single connector technology" that would let "electrical USB 3.0 ... and piggyback on USB 3.0 or 4.0 DC power." Light Peak aimed to make great strides in consumer-ready optical technology, by then having achieved "[connectors rated] for 7,000 insertions, which matches or exceeds other PC connections ... cables [that were tied] in multiple knots to make sure it didn't break and the loss is acceptable," and, "You can almost get two people pulling on it at once and it won't break the fibre." They predicted that "Light Peak cables will be no more expensive than HDMI."

In January 2011, Intel's David Perlmutter told Computerworld that initial Thunderbolt implementations would be based on copper wires. "The copper came out very good, surprisingly better than what we thought," he said. A major advantage of copper is the ability to carry power. The final Thunderbolt standard specifies 10 W DC on every port. See comparison section below.

Intel and industry partners are still developing optical Thunderbolt hardware and cables. The optical fiber cables would run "tens of meters" but would not supply power, at least not initially. The conversion of electrical signal to optical is embedded into the cable itself, so the current MDP connector is forward compatible. Eventually, Intel hopes for a purely optical transceiver assembly embedded in the PC.

The first such optical Thunderbolt cable was introduced by Sumitomo Electric Industries in January 2013. However, those cables are retailed almost exclusively in Japan, and the price is 20 to 30 times higher than copper Thunderbolt cables.

In September 2013, glass company Corning Inc. released the first range of optical Thunderbolt cables available in the Western marketplace outside Japan, along with optical USB 3.0 cables, both under the brand name "Optical Cables". Half the diameter of and 80% lighter than comparable copper Thunderbolt cables, they work with the 10 Gbit/s Thunderbolt protocol and the 20 Gbit/s Thunderbolt 2 protocol, and thus are able to work with all self-powered Thunderbolt devices (unlike copper cables, optical cables cannot provide power). This lets peripheral Thunderbolt devices be farther from their host device(s).

Before 2020, there were no optical Thunderbolt 3 cables on the market. However, optical Thunderbolt 1 and 2 cables could be used at the time with Apple's Thunderbolt 3 (USB-C) to Thunderbolt 2 adapters on each end of the cable. This achieves connections up to the  maximum offered by previous versions of the standard.

In April 2019, Corning showed an optical Thunderbolt 3 cable at the 2019 NAB Show in Las Vegas.

In early 2021, copper Thunderbolt 4 cables arrived from many companies at the  length. Copper versions of Thunderbolt 4 cables offer full 40 Gbit/s speed and support backward compatibility with all versions of USB (up to USB4), DisplayPort Alternate Mode (DP 1.4 HBR3), and Thunderbolt 3.

Thunderbolt 1
CNET's Brooke Crothers said it was rumored that the early-2011, MacBook Pro update would include some sort of new data port, and he speculated it would be Light Peak (Thunderbolt). At the time, there were no details on the physical implementation, and mock-ups appeared showing a system similar to the earlier Intel demos using a combined USB/Light Peak port. Shortly before the release of the new machines, the USB Implementers Forum (USB-IF) announced they would not allow such a combination port, and that USB was not open to modification in that way.
 
Other implementations of the technology began in 2012, with desktop boards offering the interconnection now available.

Apple stated in February 2011 that the port was based on Mini DisplayPort, not USB. As the system was described, Intel's solution to the display connection problem became clear: Thunderbolt controllers multiplex data from existing DP systems with data from the PCIe port into a single cable. Older displays that using DP 1.1a or earlier must be located at the end of a Thunderbolt device chain, but native displays can be anywhere along the line. Thunderbolt devices can go anywhere on the chain. In that respect, Thunderbolt shares a relationship with the older ACCESS.bus system, which used the display connector to support a low-speed bus.

Apple states that up to six daisy-chained peripherals are supported per Thunderbolt port, and that the display should come at the end of the chain, if it does not support daisy chaining.

In February 2011, Apple introduced MacBook Pro (13-inch, Early 2011), Macbook Pro (15-inch, Early 2011), and Macbook Pro (17-inch, Early 2011) featuring one Thunderbolt port. In May 2011, Apple introduced iMac (21.5-inch, Mid 2011) featuring one Thunderbolt port, and iMac (27-inch, Mid 2011) featuring two Thunderbolt ports. In July 2011, Apple introduced Mac mini (Mid 2011), MacBook Air (11-inch, Mid 2011), MacBook Air (13-inch, Mid 2011) and Apple Thunderbolt Display featuring one Thunderbolt port.

In May 2011, Apple announced a new line of iMacs that include the Thunderbolt interface.

The Thunderbolt port on the new Macs is in the same location relative to other ports and maintains the same physical dimensions and pinout as the prior MDP connector. The main visible difference on Thunderbolt-equipped Macs is a Thunderbolt symbol next to the port.

The DisplayPort standard is partially compatible with Thunderbolt, as the two share Apple's physically compatible MDP connector. The Target Display mode on iMacs requires a Thunderbolt cable to accept a video-in signal from another Thunderbolt-capable computer. A DP monitor must be the last (or only) device in a chain of Thunderbolt devices.

Intel announced they would release a developer kit in the second quarter of 2011, while manufacturers of hardware-development equipment have indicated they will add support for the testing and development of Thunderbolt devices. The developer kit is being provided only on request.

In July 2011, Sony released its Vaio Z21 line of notebook computers that had a "Power Media Dock" that uses optical Thunderbolt (Light Peak) to connect to an external graphics card using a combination port that behaves like USB electrically, but that also includes the optical interconnect required for Thunderbolt.

Thunderbolt 2
In June 2013, Intel announced that the next version of Thunderbolt, based on the controller code-named "Falcon Ridge" (running at 20 Gbit/s), is officially named "Thunderbolt 2" and entered production in 2013. The data-rate of 20 Gbit/s is made possible by joining the two existing 10 Gbit/s-channels, which does not change the maximum bandwidth, but makes using it more flexible. 

In June 2013, Apple announced Mac Pro (Late 2013) featuring six Thunderbolt 2 ports. In October 2013, Apple announced MacBook Pro (Retina, 13-inch, Late 2013), and MacBook Pro (Retina, 15-inch, Late 2013) featuring two Thunderbolt 2 ports. In October 2014, Apple announced Mac mini (Late 2014), and iMac (Retina 5K, 27-inch, Late 2014) featuring two Thunderbolt 2 ports. In March 2015, Apple announced MacBook Air (11-inch, Early 2015), and MacBook Air (13-inch, Early 2015) featuring one Thunderbolt 2 port. 

At the physical level, the bandwidth of Thunderbolt 1 and Thunderbolt 2 are identical, and Thunderbolt 1 cabling is thus compatible with Thunderbolt 2 interfaces. At the logical level, Thunderbolt 2 enables channel aggregation, whereby the two previously separate 10 Gbit/s channels can be combined into a single logical 20 Gbit/s channel.

Intel says Thunderbolt 2 will be able to transfer a 4K video while simultaneously displaying it on a discrete monitor.

Thunderbolt 2 incorporates DisplayPort 1.2 support, which allows for video streaming to a single 4K video monitor or dual QHD monitors. Thunderbolt 2 is backwards compatible, which means that all Thunderbolt cables and connectors are compatible with Thunderbolt 1.

The first Thunderbolt 2 product for the consumer market was Asus's Z87-Deluxe/Quad motherboard, announced on 19 August 2013, and the first system released with Thunderbolt 2 was Apple's late 2013 Retina MacBook Pro, on 22 October 2013.

Thunderbolt 3

Thunderbolt 3 is a hardware interface developed by Intel. It shares USB-C connectors with USB, and can require special "active" cables for maximum performance for cable lengths over 0.5 meters (1.5 feet). Compared to Thunderbolt 2, it doubles the bandwidth to 40 Gbit/s (5 GB/s). It allows up to 4 lanes of PCI Express 3.0 (32.4 Gbit/s) for general-purpose data transfer, and 4 lanes of DisplayPort 1.4 HBR3 (32.40 Gbit/s before 8/10 encoding removal, and 25.92 Gbit/s after) for video, but the maximum combined data rate cannot exceed 40Gbit/s; video data will be using all needed speed, limiting PCIe data. DP 1.2 support is mandatory, while DP 1.4 is optional. Other overheads are possible on PCIe data (1.5% of 128b/130b is also removed) and Thunderbolt 3 protocol (you either optimise for speed or for latency), the last one gives only 21.6 Gbit/s to 25 Gbit/s. Thunderbolt 3 uses 64b/66b encoding after that, which means the real rate is bigger than 40 Gbit/s, 2 times 20.625 Gbit/s.

Intel's Thunderbolt 3 controller (codenamed Alpine Ridge, or the new Titan Ridge) halves power consumption, and simultaneously drives two external 4K displays at 60 Hz (or a single external 4K display at 120 Hz, or a 5K display at 60 Hz when using Apple's implementation for the late-2016 MacBook Pros) instead of just the single display previous controllers can drive. The new controller supports PCIe 3.0 and other protocols, including DisplayPort 1.2 (allowing for 4K resolutions at 60 Hz). Thunderbolt 3 has up to 15 watts of power delivery on copper cables and no power delivery capability on optical cables. Using USB-C on copper cables, it can incorporate USB power delivery, allowing the ports to source or sink up to 100 watts of power. This eliminates the need for a separate power supply from some devices. Thunderbolt 3 allows backwards compatibility with the first two versions by the use of adapters or transitional cables.

Intel offers three varieties for each of the controllers:
 Double Port (DP) uses a PCIe 3.0 ×4 link to provide two Thunderbolt 3 ports (DSL6540, JHL6540, JHL7540)
 Single Port (SP) uses a PCIe 3.0 ×4 link to provide one Thunderbolt 3 port (DSL6340, JHL6340, JHL7340)
 Low Power (LP) uses a PCIe 3.0 ×2 link to provide one Thunderbolt 3 port (JHL6240).

This follows previous practice, where higher-end devices such as the second-generation Mac Pro, iMac, Retina MacBook Pro, and Mac Mini use two-port controllers; while lower-end, lower-power devices such as the MacBook Air use the one-port version.

Support was added to Intel's Skylake architecture chipsets, shipping during late 2015 into early 2016.

Devices with Thunderbolt 3 ports began shipping at the beginning of December 2015, including notebooks running Microsoft Windows (from Acer, Asus, Clevo, HP, Dell, Dell Alienware, Lenovo, MSI, Razer, and Sony), as well as motherboards (from Gigabyte Technology), and a 0.5 m Thunderbolt 3 passive USB-C cable (from Lintes Technology).

In October 2016, Apple announced MacBook Pro (13-inch, 2016, 2 Thunderbolt 3 Ports) which, as the name indicates, features two Thunderbolt 3 ports, MacBook Pro (13-inch, 2016, 4 Thunderbolt 3 Ports), and MacBook Pro (15-inch, 2016), which features four Thunderbolt 3 ports. In June 2017, Apple announced iMac (21.5-inch, 2017), iMac (Retina 4K, 21.5-inch, 2017), iMac (Retina 5K, 27-inch, 2017) which feature two Thunderbolt 3 ports, as well as the iMac Pro, which featured four Thunderbolt 3 ports and was released in December 2017. In October 2018, Apple announced MacBook Air (Retina, 13-inch, 2018), and Mac mini (2018) both featuring two Thunderbolt 3 ports. In June 2019, Apple unveils Mac Pro (2019) and Mac Pro (Rack, 2019) featuring up to twelve Thunderbolt 3 ports, and Pro Display XDR with features one Thunderbolt 3 port, both released in December 2019. In April 2021, Apple announced iPad Pro 11-inch (3rd generation) and iPad Pro 12.9-inch (5th generation) featuring one Thunderbolt 3 port. In March 2022, Apple released Studio Display featuring one Thunderbolt 3 port.

On 8 January 2018, Intel announced a product refresh (codenamed Titan Ridge) with "enhanced robustness" and support for DisplayPort 1.4. Intel offers a single port (JHL7340) and double port (JHL7540) version of this host controller and a peripheral controller supporting two Thunderbolt 3 ports (JHL7440). The new peripheral controller can now act as a USB sink (compatible with regular USB-C ports).

The Apple Pro Display XDR, which macOS allows to connect using two HBR3 connections to a Mac, doesn’t support DSC. That would be 51.84 Gbit/s, impossible for Thunderbolt 3, but it works because the two 3008×3384 10bpc 60Hz 648.91MHz signals of the XDR display only require 38.9 Gbit/s total and Thunderbolt does not transmit the DisplayPort stuffing symbols used to fill the HBR3 bandwidth.

USB4

The USB4 specification was released on 29 August 2019 by USB Implementers Forum, based on the Thunderbolt 3 protocol specification.

It supports 40 Gbit/s (5 GB/s) throughput, is compatible with Thunderbolt 3, and backwards compatible with USB 3.2 and USB 2.0. The architecture defines a method to share a single high-speed link with multiple end device types dynamically that best serves the transfer of data by type and application.

USB4 supports DisplayPort 2.0 over its alternative mode.

In November 2020, Apple announced MacBook Air (M1, 2020), MacBook Pro (13-inch, M1, 2020), and Mac mini (M1, 2020) featuring USB4. In April 2021, Apple announced iMac (24-inch, M1, 2021) featuring two USB4 ports.

USB4 PCIe Mode

USB4 makes the PCIe aspects of Thunderbolt "open source" – PCIe USB devices can be released without Thunderbolt certification.  But notably, those devices will not be allowed to use Thunderbolt branding. However, Thunderbolt 4 devices use PCIe Mode with added certification labeling, and promoting backwards compatibility. This means multiple rival devices may use different brandings to accomplish the same task. USB4 PCIe devices can be backwards compatible with Thunderbolt 1–3, but are not required to do so. USB4 PCIe Mode is not considered an "Alt Mode" like DP Alt Mode, and Microsoft requires devices with USB4 to include PCIe support currently, in order to be WHQL/Windows certified PCs.

Thunderbolt 4
Thunderbolt 4 was announced at CES 2020 and the final specification was released in July 2020. The key differences between Thunderbolt 4 and Thunderbolt 3 are a minimum bandwidth requirement of 32 Gbit/s for PCIe link, support for dual 4K displays (DisplayPort 1.4), and Intel VT-d-based direct memory access protection to prevent physical DMA attacks.

Another major improvement is that Thunderbolt 4 now supports Thunderbolt Alternate Mode USB hubs ("Multi-port Accessory Architecture"), and not just daisy chaining. Those hubs are backwards compatible with Thunderbolt 3 devices and can be backwards compatible with Thunderbolt 3 hosts (Titan Ridge only, with Alpine Ridge the additional downstream ports get downgraded to USB 3).

The maximum bandwidth remains at 40 Gbit/s, the same as Thunderbolt 3 and four times faster than USB 3.2 Gen2x1. Supporting products began arriving in late 2020 and included Tiger Lake mobile processors for Project Athena notebooks and 8000-series standalone Thunderbolt controllers (codenamed Goshen Ridge for devices and Maple Ridge for hosts).
USB4 supports DisplayPort 2.0 over its alternative mode. DisplayPort 2.0 can support higher than 8K resolution at 60 Hz losslessly due to new UHBR 10, 13.5, and 20 signaling standards (DSC 1.2 used in DisplayPort 1.4 for that resolution is not lossless) in 8 bit and 8K 60 Hz with 10 bit color and use up to 80 Gbit/s (effective bandwidth 77.37 Gbit/s), which is double the amount available to USB data, because (just as previously in DisplayPort 1.4) it sends almost all the data in one direction (to the monitor) and can thus use all four data lanes at once. Resolutions up to 16K (15360×8640) 60 Hz display with 10 bit Y'CbCr 4:4:4 or RGB are possible.

In October 2021, Apple announced MacBook Pro (14-inch, 2021) and MacBook Pro (16-inch, 2021) featuring three Thunderbolt 4 ports. In March 2022, Apple announced Mac Studio (2022) featuring up to six Thunderbolt 4 ports.

Thunderbolt 5
On October 19, 2022, Intel previewed the next generation of Thunderbolt, aligned to the USB Implementers Forum's (USB-IF) release of the USB4 2.0 specification. It delivers up to 80 Gbit/s of bi-directional bandwidth, allowing for up to two times faster data transfer speeds between future host device and external storage drives that support the standard, compared to current Thunderbolt 4 speeds. It will also have a mode allowing up to 120 Gbit/s bandwidth for external displays (three times Thunderbolt 4 speed), allowing a host device to support up to dual 8K displays at 60Hz.

The full specifications cover:
 Supporting the latest version of USB4 2.0 80 Gbit/s specification
 Two times the total bandwidth of Thunderbolt 4 to 80 Gbit/s, while providing up to three times the bandwidth to 120 Gbit/s for video-intensive uses
 Support for DisplayPort 2.1
 Two times the PCI Express data-throughput, for faster storage and external graphics
 Works with existing passive cables up to  via a new signaling technology
 Compatible with previous versions of Thunderbolt, USB, and DisplayPort
 Supported by Intel's enabling and certification programs

While a release date is not available, Intel advised those interested to "look for more detail on next-generation Thunderbolt’s official brand name, features, and capabilities in 2023."

Royalty situation
On 24 May 2017, Intel announced that Thunderbolt 3 would become a royalty-free standard to OEMs and chip manufacturers in 2018, as part of an effort to boost the adoption of the protocol. The Thunderbolt 3 specification was later released to the USB-IF on 4 March 2019, making it royalty-free, to be used to form USB4. Intel says it will retain control over certification of all Thunderbolt 3 devices. Intel also states it employs "mandatory certification for all Thunderbolt products".

Before March 2019, there were no AMD chipsets or computers with Thunderbolt support released or announced due to the certification requirements (Intel did not certify non-Intel platforms). However, the YouTuber Wendell Wilson from Level1Techs was able to get Thunderbolt 3 support on an AMD computer with a Threadripper CPU and Titan Ridge add-in card working by modifying the firmware, indicating that the lack of Thunderbolt support on non-Intel systems is not due to any hardware limitations. As of May 2019, it is possible to have Thunderbolt 3 support on AMD using add-in cards without any problems, and motherboards like ASRock X570 Creator already have Thunderbolt 3 port.

In January 2020 Intel certified ASRock X570 Phantom Gaming ITX/TB3 and now vendors are freely allowed to produce Thunderbolt controller silicon (even though those ASRock motherboards used Intel Titan Ridge).

Asus currently supports Thunderbolt 3 on AMD with the add-in card Thunderboltex 3-TR, being compatible with AMD motherboards and Ryzen 3, 5 (56xx): ROG Strix B550-E Gaming, ROG Strix B550-F Gaming, Prime B550-PLUS, TUF Gaming B550-Plus. The ASUS ProArt B550-Creator has 2 Thunderbolt 4 ports.

Peripheral devices

The first Thunderbolt peripheral devices appeared in retail stores only in late 2011, following Apple's release of its first Thunderbolt-equipped computer in early 2011 with MacBook Pro, with the relatively expensive Pegasus R4 (4-drive) and Pegasus R6 (6-drive) RAID enclosures by Promise Technology aimed at the prosumer and professional market, initially offering up to 12 TB of storage, later increased to 18 TB. Sales of these units were hurt by the 2011 floods in Thailand (who manufacture much of the world's supply of hard-drives) resulting in a cut to worldwide hard-drive production and a subsequent driving-up of storage costs, hence the retail price of these Promise units increased in response, contributing to a slower take-up of the devices.

It also took some time for other storage manufacturers to release products: most were smaller devices aimed at the professional market, and focused on speed rather than high capacity. Many storage devices were under 1 TB in size, with some featuring SSDs for faster external-data access rather than standard hard-drives.

Other companies have offered interface products that can route multiple older, usually slower, connections through a single Thunderbolt port. In July 2011, Apple released its Apple Thunderbolt Display, whose gigabit Ethernet and other older connector types made it the first hub of its type. Later, companies such as Belkin, CalDigit, Other World Computing, Matrox, StarTech, and Elgato have all released Thunderbolt docks.

As of late 2012, few other storage devices offering double-digit TB capacity had appeared. Exceptions included Sonnet Technologies' highly priced professional units, and Drobo's 4- and 5-drive enclosures, the latter featuring their own BeyondRAID proprietary data-handling system.

Backwards compatibility with non-Thunderbolt-equipped computers was a problem, as most storage devices featured only two Thunderbolt ports, for daisy-chaining up to six devices from each one. In mid-2012, LaCie, Drobo, and other device makers started to swap out one of the two Thunderbolt ports for a USB 3.0 connection on some of their low-to-mid end products. Later models had the USB 3.0 added in addition to the two Thunderbolt ports, including those from LaCie on their 2big range.

Apple devices
Apple released its first Thunderbolt-equipped computer in early 2011 with MacBook Pro, and have continued to immediately update their devices with newer generations of Thunderbolt as soon as available.

List of Apple devices featuring Thunderbolt ports include:

 MacBook Pro (Retina, 13-inch, Late 2012 to Early 2013)
 MacBook Pro (Retina, 15-inch, Mid 2012 to Early 2013)
 MacBook Pro (17-inch, Early 2011 to Late 2011)
 MacBook Pro (15-inch, Early 2011 to Mid 2012)
 MacBook Pro (13-inch, Early 2011 to Mid 2012)
 MacBook Air (13-inch, Mid 2011 to Early 2014)
 MacBook Air (11-inch, Mid 2011 to Early 2014)
 Mac Mini (Mid 2011 to Late 2012)
 iMac (27-inch, Mid 2011 to Late 2013)
 iMac (21.5-inch, Mid 2011 to Mid 2014)

The late 2013 Retina MacBook Pro was the first product to have Thunderbolt 2 ports, following which manufacturers started to update their model offerings to those featuring the newer, faster, 20 Gbit/s connection throughout 2014. Again, among the first was Promise Technology, who released updated Pegasus 2 versions of their R4 and R6 models along with an even larger R8 (8-drive) RAID unit, offering up to 32 TBs of storage. Later, other brands similarly introduced high capacity models with the newer connection type, including SanDisk Professional (with their G-RAID Studio models offering up to 24 TB) and LaCie (with their 5big, and rack mounted 8big models, offering up to 48 TB). LaCie also offering updated designed versions of their 2big mainstream consumer models, up to 12 TB, using new 6 TB hard-drives.

List of Apple devices featuring Thunderbolt 2 ports include:

 MacBook Pro (Retina, 15-inch, Late 2013 to Mid 2015)
 MacBook Pro (Retina, 13-inch, Late 2013 to Early 2015)
 MacBook Air (13-inch, Early 2015 to 2017)
 MacBook Air (11-inch, Early 2015)
 Mac Mini (Late 2014)
 iMac (Retina 4K, 21.5-inch, Late 2015)
 iMac (21.5-inch, Late 2015)
 iMac (Retina 5K, 27-inch, Late 2014 to Late 2015)
 Mac Pro (Late 2013)

Thunderbolt 3 was introduced in late 2015, with several motherboard manufacturers and OEM laptop manufacturers including Thunderbolt 3 with their products. Gigabyte and MSI, large computer component manufacturers, entered the market for the first time with Thunderbolt 3 compatible components.

Dell was the first to include Thunderbolt 3 ports in laptops with their XPS Series and their Dell Alienware range.

Apple first included Thunderbolt 3 on Mac in 2016.

Although Thunderbolt has initially had poor hardware support outside of Apple devices, and has been relegated to a niche gadget port, with the adoption of Thunderbolt 3 that uses the USB-C connector standard, meant that a much wider array of hardware was accepting of the market acceptance of the standard, especially when it later became part of USB4 standard. 

List of Apple devices featuring Thunderbolt 3 ports include: 

 MacBook Pro (13-inch, M1, 2020 to M2, 2022)
 MacBook Pro (16-inch, 2019)
 MacBook Pro (15-inch, 2016 to 2019)
 MacBook Pro (13-inch, Four Thunderbolt 3 ports, 2016 to 2020)
 MacBook Pro (13-inch, Two Thunderbolt 3 ports, 2016 to 2020)
 MacBook Air (M1, 2020 to M2, 2022)
 MacBook Air (Retina, 13-inch, 2018 to 2020)
 Mac Mini (2018 to M1, 2020)

 iMac (24-inch, M1, 2021)
 iMac (Retina 5K, 27-inch, 2017 to 2020)
 iMac (Retina 4K, 21.5-inch, 2017 to 2019)
 iMac (21.5-inch, 2017)
 iMac Pro

 Mac Pro (2019 + Rack, 2019)
 iPad Pro 12.9-inch (5th generation)
 iPad Pro 11-inch (3rd generation)

Apple started to include Thunderbolt 4 on some of their devices, starting in 2021 with MacBook Pro.

List of Apple devices featuring Thunderbolt 4 ports include:

 MacBook Pro (14-inch, M1, 2021 to M2, 2023)
 MacBook Pro (16-inch, M1, 2021 to M2, 2023)
 Mac Studio (2022)
 Mac Mini (2023)

Security vulnerabilities

Vulnerability to DMA attacks

Thunderbolt 3 – like many high-speed expansion buses, including PCI Express, PC Card, ExpressCard, FireWire, PCI, and PCI-X — is potentially vulnerable to a direct memory access (DMA) attack. If users extend the PCI Express bus (the most common high-speed expansion bus in systems ) with Thunderbolt, it allows very low-level access to the computer. An attacker could physically attach a malicious device, which, through its direct and unimpeded access to system memory and other devices, would be able to bypass almost all security measures of the operating system, allowing the attacker to read and write system memory, potentially exposing encryption keys or installing malware. Such attacks have been demonstrated, modifying inexpensive commodity Thunderbolt hardware. The IOMMU virtualization, if present, and configured by the BIOS and the operating system, can close a computer's vulnerability to DMA attacks, but only if a malicious device can't alter the code that configures the IOMMU before the code is executed. As of 2019, the major OS vendors had not taken into account the variety of ways in which a malicious device could take advantage of complex interactions between multiple emulated peripherals, exposing subtle bugs and vulnerabilities. Some UEFI implementations offer Kernel DMA Protection. Intel® VT-d-based direct memory access (DMA) protection is a requirement for Thunderbolt 4 Certification. 

This vulnerability is not present when Thunderbolt is used as a system interconnection ( supported on OS X Mavericks), because the IP implementation runs on the underlying Thunderbolt low-latency packet-switching fabric, and the PCI Express protocol is not present on the cable. That means that if IPoTB networking is used between a group of computers, there is no threat of such DMA attack between them.

Vulnerability to Option ROM attacks
When a system with Thunderbolt boots, it loads and executes Option ROMs from attached devices. A malicious Option ROM can allow malware to execute before an operating system is started. It can then invade the kernel, log keystrokes, or steal encryption keys. The ease of connecting Thunderbolt devices to portable computers makes them ideal for evil-maid attacks.

Some systems load Option ROMs during firmware updates, allowing the malware in a Thunderbolt device's Option ROM to potentially overwrite the SPI flash ROM containing the system's boot firmware. In February 2015, Apple issued a Security Update to Mac OS X to eliminate the vulnerability of loading Option ROMs during firmware updates, although the system is still vulnerable to Option ROM attacks during normal boots.

Firmware-enforced boot security measures, such as UEFI Secure Boot (which specifies the enforcement of signatures or hash allowlists of Option ROMs) are designed to mitigate this kind of attack.

Vulnerability to data exposure attacks (Thunderspy)
In May 2020, the Thunderspy seven major security flaws were discovered in the Thunderbolt protocol, which allow a malicious party to access all data stored in a computer, even if the device is locked, password-protected, and has an encrypted hard drive. These vulnerabilities affect all Thunderbolt 1, 2 and 3 ports. Thunderspy vulnerabilities can largely be mitigated using Kernel DMA Protection, along with traditional anti-intrusion hardware features.

Cables

In June 2011, the first  length Thunderbolt cable was released from Apple, costing US$49. As an active cable, it contains circuitry in its connectors.

Several other brands have released copper Thunderbolt cables, with some going up to the maximum  allowable for copper Thunderbolt 1 & 2 cables. Initially, most devices did not come with an included Thunderbolt cable to keep selling cost lower, hence the mass usage of Apple's cables or third-party cables, especially if a user wanted  length, but most devices eventually began including some length of copper Thunderbolt cable with the product.

With the introduction of Thunderbolt 3, Intel announced that otherwise-standard passive USB-C cables would be able to connect Thunderbolt devices at lower speeds than full active Thunderbolt cables, but still faster than USB 3.1. This allows for cheaper connections to new Thunderbolt devices, with inexpensive USB-C cables costing significantly less than active Thunderbolt cables.

Additionally, only the passive cables are able to offer compatibility with up to USB 3 ports, while active ones only support up to USB 2.0. Much later on, from April 2020, optical Thunderbolt 3 cables were finally released (see Copper vs. optical section above).

Copper versions of Thunderbolt 4 cables offer full  speed and support backward compatibility with all versions of USB (up to USB4), DisplayPort Alternate Mode (DP 1.4 HBR3), and Thunderbolt 3.

Controllers

See also

 Apple Thunderbolt Display
 Computer bus
 DisplayPort / Mini DisplayPort
 IEEE 1394 (FireWire)
 Interconnect bottleneck
 Lightning
 Lightning Bolt
 List of interface bit rates
 List of computer peripheral bus bit rates
 MacBook Pro
 Optical communication
 Fiber-optic cable
 Parallel optical interface
 eGPU
 USB 3.0
 USB4
 USB-C

References

Further reading

External links

  – official site

Computer-related introductions in 2009
Computer buses
Fiber optics
Fiber-optic communications
Intel products
Optical communications
Optoelectronics
Peripheral Component Interconnect